Sabrina Palie (born 23 July 1981) is a French basketball player. She was born in Oullins, France.

Palie plays for club Villeneuve d'Ascq of the LFB, the top women's basketball league in France. She has played for other teams, including: Challes (France), Napoli BK (Italy), Aix-en-Provence (France), Union Hainaut (France), and Priolo (Italy).

References

French women's basketball players
1981 births
Living people
People from Oullins
Sportspeople from Lyon Metropolis